I Love You, Stupid is a 2020 Spanish romantic comedy film written and directed by Laura Mañá. The film stars Quim Gutiérrez, Natalia Tena and Alfonso Bassave in the lead roles.

Plot 
Marcos (Quim Gutiérrez), a young man faces series of nightmares after having a breakup with his longtime girlfriend Ana (Alba Ribas) ending an eight year old romantic relationship between the duo. Marcos loses his job on the day after his breakup with Ana and he desperately sets out to reinvent himself and has to revisit the basics of being a modern man with the help of his childhood friend and an Argentinian YouTube guru.

Cast

Production 
The film was produced by Brutal Media, Minoria Absoluta, Lastor Media and Yo hombre la película AIE, with the participation of ICEC, RTVE, TV3 and Netflix.

Release 
Distributed by Filmax, the film was theatrically released in Spain on 24 January 2020. It was also streamed via Netflix on 15 May 2020.

Reception 
It received mixed reviews from critics.

Awards and nominations 

|-
| align = "center" | 2021 || 13th Gaudí Awards || Best Supporting Actor || Ernesto Alterio ||  || 
|}

See also 
 List of Spanish films of 2020

References

External links 
 
 

2020 films
2020s Spanish-language films
Spanish romantic comedy films
Spanish-language Netflix original films
2020 romantic comedy films
2020s Spanish films